Kita or KITA may refer to:

People
 Kita (surname)
 Kita Alexander (born 1996), Australian singer-songwriter
 João Leithardt Neto, Brazilian footballer nicknamed Kita
 Sampsa Astala, Finnish musician whose stage name is Kita

Places

In Japan
 Kita-ku (北区), meaning “northern ward”, is a ward name found in several cities:
 Kita-ku, Hamamatsu
 Kita-ku, Kobe
 Kita-ku, Kumamoto
 Kita-ku, Kyoto
 Kita-ku, Nagoya
 Kita-ku, Niigata
 Kita-ku, Okayama
 Kita-ku, Osaka
 Kita-ku, Saitama
 Kita-ku, Sakai
 Kita-ku, Sapporo
 Kita-ku, Tokyo
 Kita, Hokkaidō (北村), a village in Hokkaidō
 A local term for the northern commercial district of Osaka (part of, but not the same as, Kita-ku)
 Kita District, Ehime (喜多郡)
 Kita District, Kagawa (木田郡)
 Kita Station (喜多駅), a railway station in Miyazu, Kyoto Prefecture
 Mount Kita (北岳), a mountain of the Akaishi Mountains in Yamanashi Prefecture

Elsewhere
 Kita, Mali, a town in Mali
 Kita, Łódź Voivodeship, central Poland
 One of the Maug Islands

Other uses
 KITA (FM), an American radio station
 Kita (Noh school) (喜多), a school of Noh theatre
 Korea International Trade Association
 People's Welfare Party (Malaysia), a Malaysian political party
 Sony Ericsson Yari, known as Kita in the Philippines
 A common shorthand for Kindertagesstätte (kindergarten) in Germany (as Kita or KiTa)

See also